Jarno Mattila (born 10 November 1984) is a Finnish former professional footballer. He usually played on the left side as a defender or a midfielder, originally he has mostly played at striker.

He won the Finnish Cup with his side FC Haka in 2005.

References
Guardian Football

1984 births
Living people
Veikkausliiga players
FC Haka players
Finnish footballers
Association football forwards
Association football fullbacks
People from Valkeakoski
Sportspeople from Pirkanmaa